The 2002 UEFA Champions League final was the final match of the 2001–02 UEFA Champions League, Europe's primary club football competition. The show-piece event was contested between Bayer Leverkusen of Germany and Real Madrid of Spain at Hampden Park in Glasgow, Scotland on 15 May 2002 to decide the winner of the Champions League. Leverkusen appeared in the final for the first time, whereas Real Madrid appeared in their 12th final.

Each club needed to progress through two group stages, and two knockout rounds to reach the final. Real Madrid won their group and moved into the second group stage, which they also won, before facing the defending champions Bayern Munich and Barcelona in the knockout stage. Bayer Leverkusen finished second in their group behind Barcelona and progressed to the second group stage. There, they won their group, before beating the likes of Liverpool and Manchester United to progress to the final.

Before the match, a minute of silence was held in honour of Ukrainian manager Valeriy Lobanovskyi, who died two days earlier.

Real Madrid were regarded as favourites before the match and took the lead in the eighth minute through Raúl. Lúcio equalised five minutes later, before Zinedine Zidane scored the winning goal on the stroke of half-time, a left-footed volley into the top corner that has since gone down as one of the greatest goals in the history of the competition, to secure Real Madrid's ninth European Cup.

Teams 
In the following table, finals until 1992 were in the European Cup era, since 1993 were in the UEFA Champions League era.

Route to the final

Match

Details

Statistics

Post match
In the 2001–02 season, Bayer Leverkusen finished second in the Bundesliga and lost in the 2002 DFB-Pokal Final. After the match, Leverkusen manager Klaus Toppmöller expressed his disappointment on finishing this strong season without a title, stating: "the disappointment is huge – you don't always get the rewards you deserve in football, and no-one knows that better than us after what we have been through. We must seek consolation. Doing what we have done means we have had a very good season – but what has happened to us is difficult and makes us feel bitter."

Five Leverkusen players, Michael Ballack, Hans-Jörg Butt, Oliver Neuville, Carsten Ramelow, and Bernd Schneider went on to add a fourth silver medal at the 2002 FIFA World Cup. However, the gold medal-winning Brazil squad also included a Leverkusen player in Lúcio.

See also
2001–02 UEFA Champions League
Real Madrid CF in international football competitions

References

External links
2001–02 UEFA Champions League season at UEFA.com

Final
UEFA Champions League finals
International club association football competitions hosted by Scotland
European Cup Final 2002
European Cup Final 2002
U
Champions
Cham
International sports competitions in Glasgow
2000s in Glasgow
May 2002 sports events in the United Kingdom
Football in Glasgow